Pajenk is a Slovene surname. Notable people with the surname include:

 Alen Pajenk (born 1986), Slovenian volleyball player
 Egon Pajenk (1950–2022), Austrian footballer

Slovene-language surnames